The Journal of International Cooperation (JIC), is an open access peer-reviewed scientific journal published biannually by the Taiwan International Cooperation Alliance (TICA), and sponsored by the International Cooperation and Development Fund (Taiwan ICDF).

Scope
The journal is focused on research areas with relevance on international cooperation such as agriculture and fishery, business and management, engineering and science, public health and medicine.

History
The journal started in 2006, and since then have continuously published two issue every year. In 2011, Ming Chuan University and Taiwan ICDF started an annual International Student Paper Competition in which finalist papers are submitted to the JIC journal.

Affiliations
Published by the Taiwan International Cooperation Alliance (TICA), which integrates eighteen  leading Taiwanese universities holding English-taught international programs including National Taiwan University, National Central University, National Chung-Hsing University, National Tsing-Hua University, and others, the JIC is based in the Department of Tropical Agriculture and International Cooperation of the National Pingtung University of Science and Technology, Taiwan.

References

External links
 
 International Cooperation and Development Fund
 PubMed related information
 Taiwan International Cooperation Alliance (TICA)

English-language journals
Open access journals
International relations journals
Biannual journals